Loo is a 2012 Nepali novel by Nayan Raj Pandey. It is the fifth novel of the writer and was published in 2012 by Sangri~La Publication. The book was critically acclaimed and became a bestseller.

The book is set in a village near Indo-Nepalese border in western Nepal. The book includes the writer's own experience growing up in Nepalgunj. According to writer, the main character Elaiya is a combination of people, he knew growing up. The book was reprinted by FinePrint Publication in 2015.

Synopsis 
The book is set in a fictional village called Pattharpuruwa in Banke district of Nepal near the Indian border. The book shows the strange and everyday events of the village. Since, the village is located near Indian border, far from the capital city, the village is neglected by the central Nepalese government and troubled by the Sashastra Seema Bal, the Indian border guarding force. The village is shown being continuously being encroached by the Indian side. The major theme of this book is social realism. The book shows the socio-economic conditions of people in Madesh region of Nepal. The book shows how the people living in the region are neglected by Nepalese government.

Character 

 Elaiya, the main protagonist 
 Elaiya's father
 Elaiya's mother
 Elaiya's step mother
 Tutte Pandit, a priest
 Radiolal, a friend of Elaiya 
 Bajrangi, a friend of Elaiya 
 Karim,Nushrat's love interest
 Maheshar Kaka
 Chameli, Radiolal's wife
 Nushrat, Elaiya's love interest
 Munni
 Kabita
 Brijalala

Translation and adaptations 
The English translation of the book is to be released soon.

The book was adapted into a play by Sarita Shah in 2017. The play was presented by Tandav theatre and was staged in Mandala theatre.

See also 

 Sallipir
 Ular
 Seto Dharati

References

External links 
 Official Publisher's site
 Goodreads site

Nepalese books
Nepalese novels
21st-century Nepalese books
21st-century Nepalese novels
Books by Nayan Raj Pandey
2012 Nepalese novels
Nepalese bildungsromans
Novels set in Nepal
Nepali-language novels